The ENER 1000 was a Portuguese computer released in 1982.
It had 64 KB RAM and two -inch double-density floppy disk drives.
It ran the CP/M operating system.

The machine was developed on Universidade de Coimbra and sold through Enertrónica after 1982. More than 500 units were sold. It came with software for stock management, salary processing, and accounting.

In 1983 the machine was awarded the 1st prize for creativity at Endiel (Encontro Nacional para o Desenvolvimento das Indústrias Elétricas e Eletrónicas).

In 1984, a dozen of ENER 1000 were distributed to some secondary schools. In 1985 the ENER 1000 project ended.

Characteristics
The machine was based on eurocard cards (10 x 16 cm) connected to the motherboard using up to 8 DIN 41612 connectors. The desktop box measured 50 x 36 x 15 cm and could house up to 8 cards. There were two internal -inch double-density floppy disk drives (1.6 Mb capacity).

Minimal configuration
The minimal configuration used only 4 slots:
CPU card with a Motorola MC6809 processor and 2K EPROM
64/128 KB DRAM card
double serial interface card
floppy disc controller card

The computer could function as a multi-station machine, supporting up to 4 users in 7 terminals.

Expansion modules
Some custom built modules were available for expansion:
FPU
6809 CPU with 4K EPROM, 2K RAM e timer;
16K static RAM/ROM;
alphanumeric and graphic unit for spectral plots;
light pen;
fast ADC for Nuclear Physics applications;
four 8bit DACs;
local network node;
Winchester 5" 1/4 controller;
CRT and keyboard controller;
8088 CPU;
synchronous serial ports (HDLC and SDLC);
12-bit A/D and D/A converters;
DMA controller

References

Products introduced in 1982
6809-based home computers
Personal computers
Portuguese inventions